The 2004–05 UEFA Cup qualifying rounds was the qualification competition that determined the teams participating in the main competition of the 2004–05 UEFA Cup. It began on 13 July 2004 with the first qualifying round and ended on 26 August 2004 with the second qualifying round. The two qualifying rounds narrowed the clubs down to 80 teams in preparation for the first round.

Times are CEST (UTC+2), as listed by UEFA (local times, if different, are in parentheses).

Teams
In total, 89 teams entered qualifying stage, which consisted of the following rounds:
First qualifying round (50 teams): 50 teams which enter in this round.
Second qualifying round (64 teams): 39 teams which enter in this round, and 25 winners of the first qualifying round.

The 32 winners of the second qualifying round will advance to the first round, joining 42 other teams.

Below are the participating teams of the Champions Path (with their 2004 UEFA club coefficients), grouped by their starting rounds.

Format
Each tie is played over two legs, with each team playing one leg at home. The team that scores more goals on aggregate over the two legs advance to the next round. If the aggregate score is level, the away goals rule is applied, i.e. the team that scores more goals away from home over the two legs advances. If away goals are also equal, then extra time is played. The away goals rule is again applied after extra time, i.e. if there are goals scored during extra time and the aggregate score is still level, the visiting team advances by virtue of more away goals scored. If no goals are scored during extra time, the tie is decided by penalty shoot-out.

In the draws for each round, teams are seeded based on their UEFA club coefficients at the beginning of the season, with the teams divided into seeded and unseeded pots containing the same number of teams. A seeded team is drawn against an unseeded team to determine the ties. Prior to the draws, UEFA forms "groups" in accordance with the principles set by the Club Competitions Committee, but they are purely for convenience of the draw and do not resemble any real groupings in the sense of the competition. Teams from the same association or from associations with political conflicts as decided by UEFA may not be drawn into the same tie. After the draws, the order of legs of a tie may be reversed by UEFA due to scheduling or venue conflicts.

Round and draw dates
The schedule was as follows (all draws are held at the UEFA headquarters in Nyon, Switzerland).

First qualifying round
The draw for the first qualifying round was held on 25 June 2004, 14:00 CEST.

Seeding
A total of 50 teams played in the first qualifying round. Seeding of teams was based on their 2004 UEFA club coefficients. Prior to the draw, UEFA formed three regional groups of seeded and unseeded teams in accordance with the principles set by the Club Competitions Committee.

Summary

The first legs were played on 13 and 15 July, and the second legs on 27 and 29 July 2004.

|-
!colspan="5"|Northern Group
|-

|-
!colspan="5"|Southern–Mediterranean Group
|-

|-
!colspan="5"|Central–East Group
|-

|}
Notes

Matches

Levadia Tallinn won 3–1 on aggregate.

FH won 4–1 on aggregate.

Östers IF won 4–1 on aggregate.

Žalgiris won 4–2 on aggregate.

Ventspils won 11–0 on aggregate.

Haka won 5–2 on aggregate.

Ekranas won 3–1 on aggregate.

Vaduz won 4–2 on aggregate.

Liepājas Metalurgs won 11–2 on aggregate.

Glentoran won 4–3 on aggregate.

ÍA won 6–3 on aggregate.

Maribor won 2–1 on aggregate.

Primorje won 3–0 on aggregate.

Željezničar won 9–1 on aggregate.

Oțelul Galați won 8–1 on aggregate.

Modriča won 4–0 on aggregate.

Omonia won 8–1 on aggregate.

Partizani won 5–4 on aggregate.

Illichivets Mariupol won 4–0 on aggregate.

Tbilisi won 5–1 on aggregate.

Dinamo Tbilisi won 4–2 on aggregate.

Tiraspol won 4–1 on aggregate.

Nistru Otaci won 3–2 on aggregate.

Budapest Honvéd won 2–1 on aggregate.

Dukla Banská Bystrica won 4–0 on aggregate.

Second qualifying round
The draw for the second qualifying round was held on 30 July 2004, 14:00 CEST.

Seeding
A total of 64 teams played in the first qualifying round: 39 teams which entered in this round, and 25 winners of the first round. Seeding of teams was based on their 2004 UEFA club coefficients. Prior to the draw, UEFA formed six regional groups of seeded and unseeded teams in accordance with the principles set by the Club Competitions Committee.

Summary

The first legs were played on 10 and 12 August, and the second legs on 26 August 2004.

|-
!colspan="5"|Northern Group 1
|-

|-
!colspan="5"|Northern Group 2
|-

|-
!colspan="5"|Southern–Mediterranean Group 1
|-

|-
!colspan="5"|Southern–Mediterranean Group 2
|-

|-
!colspan="5"|Central–East Group 1
|-

|-
!colspan="5"|Central–East Group 2
|-

|}

Matches

IF Elfsborg won 3–1 on aggregate.

Beveren won 5–2 on aggregate.

Odd Grenland won 4–3 on aggregate.

1–1 on aggregate. Ventspils won on away goals.

Hammarby IF won 4–1 on aggregate.

Stabæk won 6–2 on aggregate.

3–3 on aggregate. Bodø/Glimt won 8–7 on penalties.

FH won 4–3 on aggregate.

AaB won 3–1 on aggregate.

3–3 on aggregate. Liepājas Metalurgs won on away goals.

2–2 on aggregate. Gençlerbirliği won on away goals.

Levski Sofia won 8–0 on aggregate.

Bnei Sakhnin won 6–1 on aggregate.

Steaua București won 5–4 on aggregate.

2–2 on aggregate. Maribor won on away goals.

Litex Lovech won 9–1 on aggregate.

Dinamo Zagreb won 4–2 on aggregate.

CSKA Sofia won 4–2 on aggregate.

Partizan won 1–0 on aggregate.

Maccabi Petah Tikva won 4–3 on aggregate.

Terek Grozny won 2–0 on aggregate.

3–3 on aggregate. Dinamo Tbilisi won on away goals.

Rapid Wien won 3–2 on aggregate.

Austria Wien won 3–0 on aggregate.

Dukla Banská Bystrica won 4–2 on aggregate.

Sigma Olomouc won 6–1 on aggregate.

Dnipro Dnipropetrovsk won 4–1 on aggregate.

3–3 on aggregate. Zenit Saint Petersburg won on away goals.

Újpest won 5–1 on aggregate.

Metalurh Donetsk won 5–1 on aggregate.

Legia Warsaw won 7–0 on aggregate.

1–1 on aggregate. Amica Wronki won 5–4 on penalties.

Notes

References

External links
First qualifying round, UEFA.com
Second qualifying round, UEFA.com

1
July 2004 sports events in Europe
August 2004 sports events in Europe
UEFA Cup qualifying rounds